Ray Houston (born 1 June 1933) was a former Australian rules footballer who played with St Kilda in the Victorian Football League (VFL).

Notes

External links 

Living people
1933 births
Australian rules footballers from New South Wales
St Kilda Football Club players
East Sydney Australian Football Club players